West Cape May School District is a community public school district located in West Cape May in Cape May County, New Jersey, United States, that serves students in pre-kindergarten through sixth grade. With an average of fewer than 10 students per grade, it one of the districts with the smallest enrollment in the state.

The district has been a participant in the Interdistrict Public School Choice Program.

As of the 2017-18 school year, the district and its one school had an enrollment of 103 students and 9.6 classroom teachers (on an FTE basis), for a student–teacher ratio of 10.8:1.

The district is classified by the New Jersey Department of Education as being in District Factor Group "DE", the fifth-highest of eight groupings. District Factor Groups organize districts statewide to allow comparison by common socioeconomic characteristics of the local districts. From lowest socioeconomic status to highest, the categories are A, B, CD, DE, FG, GH, I and J.

For seventh through twelfth grades, public school students attend the schools of the Lower Cape May Regional School District, which serves students from Cape May, Lower Township and West Cape May, along with students from Cape May Point who attend as part of a sending/receiving relationship. Schools in the district (with 2017-18 enrollment data from the National Center for Education Statistics) are 
Richard M. Teitelman Middle School (458 students; in grades 7 and 8) and 
Lower Cape May Regional High School (871; 9-12).

In 2013, the Lower Cape May Regional School District received a feasibility study that looked at ways to reconfigure the district, which had been established in 1956. The study considered Cape May City withdrawing from the regional district or the dissolution of the district, converting Lower Township's existing PreK-6 district to serve PreK-12, as the regional district's school facilities are located in the township. Cape May City and West Cape May could see annual savings approaching a combined $6 million from the dissolution.

History
In 2020 the West Cape May and Cape May City School District began sharing a single Superintendent. In Summer 2021 Zachary Palombo became the shared Superintendent of both the Cape May City and West Cape May districts.

School
West Cape May Elementary School serves students in grades PreK-6. The school had an enrollment of 102 students in the 2017-18 school year. It has a capacity of 117.

Previously a West Cape May High School existed. In an era of de jure educational segregation in the United States normally only white students were permitted to attend though the state made exceptions. Ordinarily black students attended Downingtown Industrial High School instead of West Cape May High. The district maintained separate white and black elementary schools, the latter West Cape May Colored Elementary School. "The Annex" was the school for black elementary school children. In 1948, when segregation was still active, white children in Rio Grande (Middle Township) were sent to West Cape May for grades 7-12.

West Cape Elementary previously served up to grade 8.

Student body
 the average student population was around 90. The school has school choice programs that attract area parents not living in West Cape May.

Administration
Core members of the district's administration are:
Zachary Palombo, Superintendent
John Thomas, Business Administrator / Board Secretary

The district's board of education has five members who set policy and oversee the fiscal and educational operation of the district through its administration. As a Type II school district, the board's trustees are elected directly by voters to serve three-year terms of office on a staggered basis, with either one or two seats up for election each year held (since 2012) as part of the November general election.

See also
 Non-high school district

References

Further reading

External links

West Cape May School District
Data for West Cape May School District, National Center for Education Statistics

West Cape May, New Jersey
New Jersey District Factor Group DE
School districts in Cape May County, New Jersey
Public elementary schools in New Jersey
Schools in Cape May County, New Jersey